The Defence School of Aeronautical Engineering (DSAE) is a Defence Training Establishment (DTEs) of the British Ministry of Defence. It was formed on 1 April 2004 and provides training for aircraft engineering officers and tradesmen across the three British armed forces.

History

The school was formed on 1 April 2004 as the Defence College of Aeronautical Engineering (DCAE) and was one of five federated defence colleges formed after the Defence Training Review. In 2012, it joined three other technical training colleges under a combined organisation, the Defence College of Technical Training, and reverted in title to being a Defence School.

On 17 January 2007, Secretary of State for Defence Des Browne announced that Metrix UK, a joint venture between Qinetiq and Land Securities, had been selected as preferred bidder for Package One of Defence training. This would locate all Aeronautical Engineering training for all three services at MOD St Athan in 2017. The project was terminated in 2010 as part of the Strategic Defence and Security Review, undertaken by the Conservative-Liberal Democrat coalition government.

Constituent elements 
The school comprises a headquarters and three affiliated schools.

Headquarters 
The DSAE headquarters is based at the RAF Cosford in Shropshire. The school reports to the Defence College of Technical Training (DCTT) which, in turn, is part of the Royal Air Force's No. 22 Group. Between 2004 and 2009 the station at Cosford was known as DCAE Cosford.

No. 1 School of Technical Training 

The RAF's No. 1 School of Technical Training is based at RAF Cosford and provides RAF personnel with mechanical, avionics, weapons and survival equipment training. The school trains around 2,000 students per year.

Aerosystems Engineer and Management Training School 
Professional and management training is provided to RAF personnel by the Aerosystems Engineer and Management Training School (AE&MTS) based at RAF Cosford.

Royal Navy Air Engineering and Survival School 
Based at  located at Gosport in Hampshire, the Royal Navy's Air Engineering and Survival School provides aeronautical engineering and survival equipment training to Royal Navy personnel. The school is divided into six elements – a headquarters, 764 Initial Training Squadron, the Advanced Training Group, the Common Training Group, the Specialist Training Group and the Training Support Group.

References

External links
 DCAE Website
 DCAE Cranwell
 No. 22 Training Group

Engineering education in the United Kingdom
Military training establishments of the United Kingdom
Military units and formations established in 2004
Organisations based in Shropshire
Organisations based in Lincolnshire
Aeronautics organizations
Defence agencies of the United Kingdom
2004 establishments in the United Kingdom